The Armenian Automobile Federation (FAA), is the regulating body of auto racing, motorsport, and kart racing in Armenia, governed by the Armenian Olympic Committee. The headquarters of the federation is located in Yerevan.

History
The Armenian Automobile Federation was founded in 1993 and is currently led by president Gagik Aghajanyan. While, Irina Belubekyan, is the president of the Federations women's league. The main aim of the Armenian Automobile Federation is to develop autosport and autotourism in Armenia, while at the same time, increasing the level of road safety in the country. The Federation oversees the training of auto racing specialists and organizes Armenia's participation in European and international level racing competitions. In 1996, the Federation became a full member of the International Automobile Federation and subsequently joined the International Karting Commission. The Federation has established cooperation agreements with other international automobile and racing federations. The Federation also cooperates with the Armenian Racers Club and the Armenian Historical Car Club.

Activities 
The Federation manages several auto racing clubs throughout Armenia and hosts several events and competitions for both professional and amateur drivers. To date, the Federation has organized over 70 national competitions. The Federation also hosts award ceremonies for special achievements made by its members.

See also 
 Automobile associations
 Sport in Armenia
 Transport in Armenia

References

External links 
 Armenian Automobile Federation official website
 Armenian Automobile Federation on Facebook

Sports governing bodies in Armenia
Auto racing organizations
Kart racing organizations
Motorsport governing bodies